Daniel Edward McMullen (May 8, 1906 – August 22, 1983) was an American football player.  He played college football at the guard position for the Nebraska Cornhuskers from 1925 to 1928.  He was selected by the Associated Press as a second-team player on the 1928 College Football All-America Team.  He also played in the National Football League (NFL) for the New York Giants (1929), Chicago Bears (1930-1931) and Portsmouth Spartans (1932). He later worked for 16 years as the football coach at Turkey Creek High School in Plant City, Florida.  He was inducted into the Nebraska Football Hall of Fame Inductee in 1979.  After retiring, he moved to St. Francis, Kansas, where he died in 1983 at age 77 after falling at his home.

References

1906 births
1983 deaths
American football guards
Nebraska Cornhuskers football players
Chicago Bears players
New York Giants players
Portsmouth Spartans players
Players of American football from Kansas
People from Belleville, Kansas
People from Plant City, Florida
People from St. Francis, Kansas